was a jōsaku-style Japanese castle built in the late  Nara period  in what is now part of the city of Tagajō in Miyagi prefecture in the Tōhoku region of far northern Honshu, Japan. Bashō tells of his visit to the site in Oku no Hosomichi. The ruins of Taga-jō and its former temple have been designated a  since 1922.

History
In the Nara period, after the establishment of a centralized government under the Ritsuryō system, the Yamato court sent a number of military expeditions to what is now the Tōhoku region of northern Japan to bring the local Emishi tribes under its control. In what is now Miyagi Prefecture, a civil administration was established in the form of a provincial capital and regional administrative centers in the late 6th century; however, a massive Emishi uprising occurred in 709 AD during which time many of these structures were destroyed. Per the Shoku Nihongi, following a huge earthquake in the year 715 AD, a large number of people migrated to this area from the southern Kantō region, forming numerous fortified settlements in the hinterland.

An inscription on a monument found at the site of Taga Castle gives a foundation date of 724 AD and states that it was constructed by Azumabito Ono as the provisional provincial capital of Mutsu Province. Along with Akita Castle and Okachi Fort in Dewa Province, it was one of the main bases for the Yamato re-expansion into northern Honshu. The castle was significantly renovated by Fujiwara Asakari in 762 AD.

Taga Castle was rebuilt after being sacked and burned by the Emishi in 780 AD. From 802 AD, the frontier between Yamato and Emishi territories shifted further north due to the successful campaigns of Sakanoue no Tamuramaro, and with the construction of Isawa Castle, Taga Castle gradually lost importance. It was retained as a center for administrative functions, but most military activities were transferred to various northern strongholds. It was badly damaged by the Jōgan tsunami of 869.

In 10th century, due to the collapse of ancient administrative system and rise of local samurai bands, the central government abandoned direct rule in favor of a feudal system of local warlords nominally under the control of various nobles in Kyoto. Taga Caste gradually fell into ruins, and rise of Hiraizumi under the Northern Fujiwara in the twelfth century saw its final demise. During the Nanboku-chō period, Kitabatake Chikafusa and his son Kitabatake Akiie briefly occupied the site for the Southern Court, but later moved to the more secure mountain fortress of Mount Ryōzen to the north. The site reverted to empty fields, and was not excavated until 1955, with more extensive investigations in 1976.

Description
Taga Castle is more of a fortified city than a military stronghold. It is located on a plateau 10 kilometer northeast of Sendai city near the Pacific coast. This area is a hill country which divides the Sendai Plain into half and which was close to Shiogama, a natural port which was also used during this era. The site was surrounded by a marsh and rivers, making it an appropriate place for defense.

The fortification was a square enclosure, approximately 3.4 kilometers in perimeter, consisting of a 5-meter high earthen rampart surmounted by a wooden palisade, and protected by a 3-4 meter wide dry moat. The east side of the castle facing the connecting hills was especially well-protected, and an east side gate was built inside of hollow of the wall guarded by corner turret.  Within the fortified main gate in the south was a main road of over 20 meters in width leading to a second square enclosure, 100 meter square, also with earthen walls. The outer area contained administrative offices, barracks and the residences of officers, while the inner area contained the higher government administrative buildings, workshops and storehouses.

About a kilometer south of the Taga Castle ruins are the ruins of a large Buddhist temple complex, and outside the southern wall of the castle are the ruins of a planned settlement.

The site today is maintained as an archaeological park. Taga Castle was listed as one of the 100 Fine Castles of Japan by the Japan Castle Foundation in 2006.

Tagajō Stele

In his account the monument functions as a poetic place or utamakura.

In 1998 it was designated an Important Cultural Property.

Tagajō Temple ruins

Excavations to the southeast of the fort have uncovered the ruins of a temple, now known as Tagajō Haiji. Such temples were built in concert with a provincial administrative center. Five buildings have been identified inside a large rectangular compound enclosed by an earthen wall.

Tōhoku History Museum

The , on the grounds of the Taga Castle, has finds from the excavations as well as from other sites in Tōhoku.

See also
Emishi
List of Historic Sites of Japan (Miyagi)
Dazaifu
List of Special Places of Scenic Beauty, Special Historic Sites and Special Natural Monuments

References

External links

Tagajō Tourist Association 
Excavation report The Comprehensive Database of Archaeological Site Reports in Japan.
Miyagi Prefectural Agency for Cultural Affairs 
JCastle info

Castles in Miyagi Prefecture
Buddhist temples in Miyagi Prefecture
Special Historic Sites
Important Cultural Properties of Japan
Tagajō, Miyagi
Ruined castles in Japan
History of Miyagi Prefecture
Nara period
Archaeological sites in Japan
Archaeological parks
Mutsu Province